Zoran "Kiki" Lesendrić is a Serbian rock musician, most notable as the founding member of the rock band Piloti.

Early career 

With Piloti he released a number of albums in the former Yugoslavia in the 1980s and 1990s, with the final album released in 1996.

He also composed hits for other musicians, most notably the hit "Kolačići" for Marina Perazić in 1987, and "Barakuda" for Viktorija in 1988. Recently he released his first solo album, Mesec na vratima ("Moon at the Door").

Later career 

In 2011, he composed the music to two songs on Lepa Brena's album Začarani krug. The lyrics to the songs, "Valja se" and "Ćutim k'o stvar", were written by Marina Tucaković. From 2013 to 2015 Lesendrić was a judge on X Factor Adria.

Discography

With Piloti

Studio albums 
 Piloti (PGP RTB, 1981)
 Dvadeset godina (PGP RTB, 1982)
 Kao ptica na mom dlanu (PGP RTB, 1987)
 Osmeh letnje noći (PGP RTB, 1988)
 Neka te bog čuva za mene (PGP RTB, 1990)
 Zaboravljeni (PGP RTS/Komuna, 1993)
 Dan koji prolazi zauvek (Komuna, 1996)
 Slučajno i zauvek (City Records, 2012)

Compilation albums 
Najveći hitovi 1981–1991 (PGP RTB, 1991)
Ne veruj u idole – Kompilacija (Bread Ventures Records, 1997)

With Dobrovoljno Pevačko Društvo 
 Nedelja na Duhove (Eastfield music, 1995)

Solo works 
 Mesec na vratima (Power music, 2008)

References

 Official page
 Exit Festival
 Zoran Lesendrić at Disocogs
 Kiki Lesendrić o muzici, albumu, planovima… govori za „Blic“ – Osamdesete se neće povratiti, Blic, December 14, 2008

1961 births
Living people
Musicians from Belgrade
Serbian rock guitarists
Serbian rock singers
Yugoslav rock singers
20th-century Serbian male singers
Singers from Belgrade
Yugoslav male singers